Madhuca obtusifolia is a species of plant in the family Sapotaceae. It is a tree endemic to Peninsular Malaysia.

References

obtusifolia
Endemic flora of Peninsular Malaysia
Trees of Peninsular Malaysia
Data deficient plants
Taxonomy articles created by Polbot